Hannah Miller (born February 16, 1996), also known by the Chinese name Mi Le, is a Canadian ice hockey player and member of the Chinese national ice hockey team,  playing in the Zhenskaya Hockey League (ZhHL) with the Shenzhen KRS.

Miller represented China in the women's ice hockey tournament at the 2022 Winter Olympics in Beijing.

Playing career
Miller played ice hockey in the Junior Women's Hockey League (JWHL) with the under-18 prep team of the Okanagan Hockey Academy, based in Penticton, British Columbia, Canada, from 2012 to 2014.

NCAA
Miller played college ice hockey with the St. Lawrence Saints women's ice hockey program in the ECAC Hockey conference of the NCAA Division I from the 2014–15 season to the 2017–18 season. As a junior in the 2016–17 season, she ranked sixth in the country with 0.92 assists per game and eleventh nationally with 1.33 points per game, tallying 15 goals and 33 assists for 48 points in 36 games, and was recognized as the ECAC Player of the Month on 2 February. She was selected as team captain for the 2017–18 season via player vote and, in her senior season, was the ECAC Player of the Week for October 11. Miller was named to the Second-Team All-ECAC Hockey in 2016–17 and 2017–18 and earned ECAC Hockey All-Academic honors in 2017–18.

Professional
After reaching out and expressing interest in playing with the China-based Canadian Women's Hockey League (CWHL) team, Miller was drafted in the third round, fifteenth overall in the 2018 CWHL Draft by the Shenzhen KRS Vanke Rays. She signed with the team for the 2018–19 CWHL season and finished her first professional ice hockey season tied with Emma Woods for second on the team with 10 goals and ranked fifth with 15 points in 20 games.

Following the collapse of the Canadian Women's Hockey League in 2019, Miller remained with the KRS Vanke Rays as they became the first non-Russian team to join the Zhenskaya Hockey League (ZhHL). In the 2019–20 ZhHL season, she scored 12 goals and 13 assists for 25 points in 24 games, ranking second on the team for goals and fourth for assists, and won the 2020 Russian Championship.

International play

As a junior player with the Canadian national under-18 team, Miller participated in the IIHF Women's U18 World Championships in 2013 and 2014, winning a gold medal at both. At the 2013 tournament, she represented Canada alongside future Chinese national team teammate Kimberly Newell on a roster that also included future Canadian senior national team players Emily Clark, Sarah Nurse, and Sarah Potomak, among others.

Miller was officially named to the Chinese women's national team roster for the women's ice hockey tournament at the 2022 Winter Olympics on 28 January 2022.

Career statistics

Regular season and playoffs

International

References

External links
 
 

1996 births
Living people
Canadian expatriate ice hockey players in China
Canadian expatriate ice hockey players in Russia
Canadian expatriate ice hockey players in the United States
Canadian women's ice hockey forwards
Djurgårdens IF Hockey Dam players
Ice hockey players at the 2022 Winter Olympics
Olympic ice hockey players of China
St. Lawrence Saints women's ice hockey players
Shenzhen KRS Vanke Rays players
Sportspeople from North Vancouver